is a railway station in the town of Mori, Shizuoka Prefecture, Japan, operated by the third sector Tenryū Hamanako Railroad.

Lines
Enden Station is served by the Tenryū Hamanako Line, and is located 14.7 kilometers from the starting point of the line at Kakegawa Station.

Station layout
The station has one side platform serving a single track with a small wooden shelter built onto the platform The station is unattended.

Adjacent stations

|-
!colspan=5|Tenryū Hamanako Railroad

Station History
Enden Station was established on March 13, 1988 as a commuter station.

Passenger statistics
In fiscal 2016, the station was used by an average of 40 passengers daily (boarding passengers only).

Surrounding area
The station is located in a residential area.

See also
 List of Railway Stations in Japan

External links

  Tenryū Hamanako Railroad Station information 
 

Railway stations in Shizuoka Prefecture
Railway stations in Japan opened in 1988
Stations of Tenryū Hamanako Railroad
Mori, Shizuoka